= Holiday & Cruise TV =

- Network: Sky

Programming
- Picture format: 576i (16:9 SDTV)

Ownership
- Owner: JAN Media Ltd.

History
- Launched: 2011
- Former names: Holiday & Cruise Channel (2011-2016)

Links
- Website: holidayandcruisetv.co.uk

Holiday & Cruise TV was a television channel in the United Kingdom and Ireland. It was launched as The Holiday & Cruise Channel on 1 August 2011, on sky TV in the UK & Ireland. It was the first TV channel in the world to feature just holidays & cruises, with new programmes everyday featuring cruise holiday offers.

The channel was also simulcast each day at selected times on Channel 5 +24 on Freeview & Virgin Media but that ended when Channel 5 was taken over by Viacom.

The main presenters included John Cooper, Richard Cross, Carly Nickson & Dom Tolley most of whom also worked for 'Vision Cruise' a cruise only travel agency based in Liverpool, UK, with offices also in Australia & USA.

In August 2016, the channel was re-branded as Holiday & Cruise TV. The Channel closed on 4 September 2018.
